The 1918 Oklahoma Sooners football team represented the University of Oklahoma in the 1918 college football season. In their 14th year under head coach Bennie Owen, the Sooners compiled a 6–0 record (2–0 against conference opponents), and outscored their opponents by a combined total of 278 to 7.

No Sooners were recognized as All-Americans.

No Sooners received All-Southwest Conference honors.

Schedule

References

Oklahoma
Oklahoma Sooners football seasons
Southwest Conference football champion seasons
College football undefeated seasons
Oklahoma Sooners football